Hastings Lake is a lake in Alberta. It is located in Strathcona County, east of Cooking Lake. The hamlet of Hastings Lake lies on the southern shore of the lake.

The lake was renamed in 1884 for Tom Hastings, a member of Tyrell's geological survey party. The original name was Kawtikh, which in the Cree language means "the lake that does not freeze".

The large forested area in the Hastings Lake Watershed is a key area for moose and white-tailed deer. With close proximity to the Cooking Lake-Blackfoot Wildlife, Grazing and Provincial Recreation Area and the Waskahegan Staging Area, many hiking and cross-country skiing possibilities exists.

For many years Hastings Lake has been an attraction for bird enthusiasts as it is home to many species of water birds. The white pelican and the cormorant make it a bird-watching destination. The islands of Hastings Lake were named as one of the "Special Places 2000" by the Alberta Government.

Activities include kayaking, canoeing, paddle boarding, or other water-based activities.

References

Hastings Lake
Strathcona County